This is a list of what are intended to be the notable top hotels by country, five or four star hotels, notable skyscraper landmarks or historic hotels which are covered in multiple reliable publications. It should not be a directory of every hotel in every country:

Romania
Dacia Hotel, Satu Mare
Hotel Continental Sibiu

Bucharest

Athénée Palace
Bucharest World Trade Center
Carol Parc Hotel
Casa Capșa
Hotel Pullman Bucharest
InterContinental Bucharest
Rin Grand Hotel

Russia

Moscow

Golden Ring Hotel
Hotel Leningradskaya
Hotel Metropol
Hotel Moskva
Izmailovo Hotel
Katerina City Hotel
Lotte Hotel Moscow
Radisson Royal Hotel
Rossiya Hotel
Savoy Hotel
Swissôtel Krasnye Holmy Moscow

Murmansk
Hotel Arctic

St. Petersburg

Angleterre Hotel
Corinthia Hotel St. Petersburg
Grand Hotel Europe
Hotel Astoria (Saint Petersburg)
Lobanov-Rostovsky Residence

Rwanda
Hôtel des Mille Collines, Kigali
Chez Lando, Kigali

References

R